Connie Lebrun (born 10 April 1955) is a Canadian former volleyball player. She competed in the women's tournament at the 1976 Summer Olympics.

References

External links
 

1955 births
Living people
Canadian women's volleyball players
Olympic volleyball players of Canada
Volleyball players at the 1976 Summer Olympics